Jason Thomas Smith (born June 16, 1980) is an American businessman and politician who has been the U.S. representative for Missouri's 8th congressional district since 2013. The district comprises 30 counties, covering just under 20,000 square miles of southeastern and southern Missouri.

Before being elected to Congress, Smith served four full terms and one partial term in the Missouri House of Representatives. He was the majority whip during the 96th Missouri General Assembly and as the speaker pro tempore during the 97th Missouri General Assembly.

Early life, education, and business career 

Smith was born in St. Louis to Bill, a former minister and auto mechanic, and Mary, a former employee of Briggs & Stratton and a dog breeder. He graduated from Salem High School in 1998.

At age 20, Smith earned two degrees from the University of Missouri: a Bachelor of Science in agriculture economics and a Bachelor of Science in business administration. He attended law school at Oklahoma City University. He is a licensed real estate agent and formed his own small business specializing in property investment and development. He earned his Juris Doctor in 2004.

After passing the Missouri Bar in 2004, Smith practiced law at a local law firm in Cuba, Missouri. He also took over his family's farm, just outside Salem, which has been in Smith's family for four generations. At this time, he was a co-owner of a dog breeding business which his mother operated.

Missouri House of Representatives 

After State Representative Frank Barnitz resigned in 2005, Smith ran for Missouri's 150th Legislative District, which covered portions of Dent, Phelps, Crawford, and Reynolds counties. Smith defeated Democratic challenger Bobby Simpson 54%–44%. At 25, Smith was just barely old enough to be a state representative and became the youngest member of the Missouri House of Representatives. During his first year in office, he served as Majority Assistant Deputy Whip and served on the Agriculture Policy Committee, Appropriations—Education Committee and the Judiciary Committee.

One year after being elected to the Missouri House of Representatives in a special election, Smith defeated Democrat Jim O'Donnell 64%–32%. In his first full term, he served as the vice chair of the Special Committee on Job Creation and Economic Development.

In his third election in just three years, Smith received 70% of the vote, defeating Democrat James D. Ellis in 2008 to secure his second full term in the Missouri House of Representatives.

In November 2010, Smith was unopposed in his reelection campaign to his fourth full term to the Missouri House of Representatives. After his reelection, he was elected by his peers to serve as one of the youngest Majority Whips to serve in the Missouri House of Representatives.

Repeal of puppy mill and animal cruelty prevention bill 
In 2011, Smith sponsored legislation to repeal Proposition B, the Puppy Mill Cruelty Prevention Act, a voter-approved piece of legislation that had toughened oversight of so-called "puppy mill" dog breeding businesses and required "daily feeding, annual veterinary care, increased living spaces and greater access to outdoor exercise" for dogs. The repeal became law that year and removed those protections.

Smith was again unopposed in his final election to the Missouri House of Representatives in 2012. Upon the start of the 97th General Assembly in 2013, he was elected by his peers to serve as the speaker pro tempore of the Missouri State House of Representatives.

U.S. House of Representatives

Elections
2013 special election

Smith ran for the vacant 8th congressional district of Missouri seat after U.S. Representative Jo Ann Emerson resigned to accept a CEO position with the National Rural Electric Cooperative Association.

Per Missouri statute, Smith was selected by the 8th District Republican Central Committee to be the party's nominee in the June special election. The selection process—which began with 27 candidates and narrowed to 13 on nomination day—lasted six total rounds before Smith was the last one standing as the Republican nominee on February 9, 2013. Some of the other candidates included State Representative Todd Richardson of Poplar Bluff, former State Treasurer of Missouri and U.S. Representative Wendell Bailey, former State Senator Jason Crowell of Cape Girardeau, Lieutenant Governor Peter Kinder, former State Treasurer of Missouri Sarah Steelman, State Representative Clint Tracy of Cape Girardeau, and State Senator Wayne Wallingford of Cape Girardeau.

In the June special election, Smith was challenged by Democratic State Representative Steve Hodges of East Prairie, businessman Doug Enyart of the Constitution Party, and Libertarian Bill Slantz. He was declared the winner of the special election on June 4. The election marked the 47th consecutive U.S. House race in Missouri in which Democrats failed to pick up a Republican-held seat dating back to 1994 – the second longest Democratic pick-up drought in the nation.

2014
After an unopposed primary election on August 5, 2014 and 17 months after the special election, Smith was up for his first reelection on November 4, 2014. He won a five-way race with two-thirds of the vote and carried all 30 counties in the district.

Tenure
In 2015, Smith condemned the Supreme Court's ruling in Obergefell v. Hodges, which held that same-sex marriage bans violated the constitution.

On March 8, 2017, Smith, during debate about a tanning salon tax under the Affordable Care Act, wondered aloud, "What I found on Google is roughly 80% of who's taxed is women... Today is International Women's Day. It's interesting no one is bringing that up." He continued, "You look at the number one cause of skin cancer... It's the sun. So I've noticed the people over here haven't found too many taxes they dislike. So why have they not proposed a tax on the sun?"

As a member of the House Ways and Means Committee, Smith had a role in writing and passing the Tax Cuts and Jobs Act.

On January 17, 2019, Smith shouted "Go back to Puerto Rico!" at House Democratic members on the House floor while Representative Tony Cardenas was presiding. He later clarified and apologized to Cardenas and stated his remark was in reference to a recent trip taken to Puerto Rico by several lawmakers, including Cardenas, not to single out anyone's ethnicity. His apology was accepted.

In December 2020, Smith was one of 126 Republican members of the House of Representatives to sign an amicus brief in support of Texas v. Pennsylvania, a lawsuit filed at the United States Supreme Court contesting certain voting procedures during the 2020 presidential election. The Supreme Court declined to hear the case on the basis that Texas lacked standing under Article III of the Constitution to challenge the results of an election held by another state. House Speaker Nancy Pelosi issued a statement that called signing the amicus brief an act of "election subversion". She also reprimanded the House members, including Smith, who supported the lawsuit: "The 126 Republican Members that signed onto this lawsuit brought dishonor to the House. Instead of upholding their oath to support and defend the Constitution, they chose to subvert the Constitution and undermine public trust in our sacred democratic institutions."

Smith was present on the floor of the House chamber during the 2021 storming of the United States Capitol.

Smith opposes COVID-19 vaccine mandates, tweeting in July 2021, "The Biden administration wants to knock down your door KGB-style to force people to get vaccinated. We must oppose forced vaccination!"

On February 9, 2022, Smith announced he would seek reelection for a sixth term and pursue the chairmanship of the House Ways and Means Committee, forgoing a run for the United States Senate in the 2022 midterm elections.

Committee assignments
United States House Committee on Ways and Means, 114th Congress - present, Chairman
 United States House Committee on the Budget, 115th Congress - 117th Congress, Ranking Member, 117th Congress
United States House Committee on the Judiciary, 113th Congress
United States House Committee on Natural Resources, 113th Congress

Caucus memberships
 Congressional Western Caucus
 Republican Study Committee
U.S.-Japan Caucus

Electoral history

Personal life
Smith is unmarried. He is a close friend of former representatives Kristi Noem and Aaron Schock and Senator Markwayne Mullin.

Smith is a lifetime member of the National Rifle Association. He attends Grace Community Church in Salem, an Assemblies of God Church. He was a board member of the Missouri Community Betterment Association, Court Appointed Special Advocates (CASA), and president of the Salem FFA Association.

References

External links 

 Congressman Jason Smith
 Jason Smith for Congress
 
 
 

|-

|-

|-

|-

|-

|-

1980 births
21st-century American lawyers
21st-century American politicians
American Pentecostals
Assemblies of God people
Living people
Republican Party members of the Missouri House of Representatives
Missouri lawyers
Oklahoma City University School of Law alumni
People from Salem, Missouri
Republican Party members of the United States House of Representatives from Missouri
University of Missouri alumni